New Asian Cinema is the first of three one-sided 12" records by the Mountain Goats on Olympia, WA's Yo Yo label. The B-side of the record includes etchings by Nikki McClure. It was produced by Pat Maley and Brooks Martin.

Track listing

References

1998 EPs
The Mountain Goats EPs